Bergamaschi is an Italian surname. Notable people with the surname include:

Arianna Bergamaschi (born 1975), Italian singer, songwriter, stage actress and television presenter
Franco Bergamaschi (born 1951), Italian footballer
Mario Bergamaschi (1929–2020), Italian footballer
Roberto Bergamaschi (born 1960), Italian footballer
Roberto Bergamaschi, Professor and colorectal surgery specialist
Valentina Bergamaschi (born 1997), Italian footballer
Vasco Bergamaschi (1909–1979), Italian cyclist

Italian-language surnames